Ghana first participated at the Olympic Games in 1952, when it was known by the colonial name of Gold Coast.  The nation has sent athletes to compete in most Summer Olympic Games since then, missing the 1956 Games, boycotting the 1976 Games in protest of the participation of New Zealand (who still had sporting links with apartheid South Africa), and joining the American-led boycott of the 1980 Summer Olympics.  Ghana participated in the Winter Olympic Games for the first time in Vancouver in 2010.

Ghanaian athletes have won a total of five Olympics medals, four (three bronze and one silver) in boxing, and a bronze medal by the under-23 Ghana national football team in 1992.

The National Olympic Committee for Ghana was created in 1951 and recognized by the International Olympic Committee the upcoming year.

Medal tables

Medals by Summer Games

Medals by Winter Games

Medals by sport

List of medalists

See also
 List of flag bearers for Ghana at the Olympics
 :Category:Olympic competitors for Ghana
 Ghana at the Paralympics
 Tropical nations at the Winter Olympics

References

External links